Endoanal ultrasound is a type of medical investigation which images the structures of the anal canal.

It is used in the investigation of some anorectal symptoms, e.g. fecal incontinence or obstructed defecation.

See also
 Medical ultrasonography

References

Colorectal surgery
Digestive system imaging
Gastroenterology
Medical ultrasonography